Tambourine Studios is a recording studio in the centre of Malmö, Sweden. It was set up by members of the Swedish band Eggstone and has been running since 1991. The studio is best known for The Cardigans albums, which were almost all recorded there. Besides Eggstone themselves, other bands to have recorded there are Bob hund, Envelopes, Cloudberry Jam, Divine Dennis, Green and Lady Lynette as well as international artists such as Saint Etienne, Good shoes and Tom Jones.

Lawsuits 

Besides being a recording studio Tambourine Studios also handled the economy of several bands and artists, something that resulted in seven lawsuits among the artists and the studio.

It started in June 2010 when Timbuktu claimed that 4,9 million Swedish krona had disappeared from his account and been transferred to other artists' companies. Timbuktu sued the active or former companies belonging to the bands The Hives, Europe, The Ark, Weeping Willows and The Soundtrack of Our Lives for 5 million Swedish krona. The Hives responded with counter-suing Timbuktu for 3.2 million Swedish krona.

Some of the involved artists stated that funds were missing and claimed that Tambourine Studios borrowed money from some accounts and lent it to others, all without approval of the involved artists. In May 2011 Timbuktu recalled his lawsuit against The Hives after they had paid  his company 2 million Swedish krona back. Later a settlement was also reached with The Ark.

Soon after The Cardigans sued The Hives for 18 million Swedish krona that they meant were lent to The Hives but never returned. The Hives sued Tambourine Studios for 9 million Swedish krona because they felt that the studio did not perform the services correctly. In May 2012 The Hives also sued their accountancy firm PWC for 177 million Swedish krona reasoning that the lawsuits had inhibited their creativity. In July 2011 The Ark sued The Hives among others for not repaying their debts.

16 April 2013 Lund District Court sentenced The Hives to pay 23.6 million Swedish krona to The Cardigans. In the judgment report the claims about the studio making accounting mistakes were dismissed as false.

The conflicts between the different parties escalated into public smear and accusations of crimes in media. An investigation about economic crimes were started in 2011, but was later closed because of lack of evidence.

22 November 2013 Malmö District Court cleared Tambourine Studios completely in the case where they were sued by The Hives for 9 million Swedish krona. Their case was dismissed in its entirety, instead the court sentenced The Hives to pay court costs of 4.4 million Swedish krona for Tambourine Studios.

References

Further reading

External links
 Official website

Tambourine
Buildings and structures in Malmö